The Chagos Marine Protected Area, located in the central Indian Ocean in the British Indian Ocean Territory of the United Kingdom, is one of the world's largest marine protected areas, and one of the largest protected areas of any type (land or sea) on Earth. It was established by the British government on 1 April 2010 as a massive, contiguous, no-take marine reserve, it encompasses  of ocean waters, including roughly 70 small islands and seven atolls of the Chagos Archipelago.

The establishment of the protected area was immediately controversial, as the largest island in the area, Diego Garcia, was forcibly depopulated to make way for a United States military base in 1968 and onwards, an action that has been described as "ethnic cleansing". In a cable leaked by WikiLeaks, a US State Department official commented based on talks with British ministers and officials that establishing the reserve to restrict fishing would be the "most effective long-term way to prevent any of the Chagos Islands' former inhabitants or their descendants from resettling." The same cable explained that the protection would permit environmental damage if caused by military use: "the terms of reference for the establishment of a marine park would clearly state that the BIOT, including Diego Garcia, was reserved for military uses. ... the establishment of a marine reserve had the potential to be a 'win-win situation in terms of establishing situational awareness' of the BIOT... [the government] sought 'no constraints on military operations' as a result of the establishment of a marine park." An exemption in the MPA allows people from the US base on Diego Garcia to continue fishing. In 2010, more than 28 tonnes of fish was caught for use by personnel on the base.

On 18 March 2015, the Permanent Court of Arbitration unanimously held that the establishment of the marine protected area (MPA) was illegal under the United Nations Convention on the Law of the Sea, as Mauritius had legally binding rights to fish in the waters surrounding the Chagos Archipelago, to an eventual return of the Chagos Archipelago, and to the preservation of any minerals or oil discovered in or near the Chagos Archipelago prior to its return.  The decision of the court is final and binding. The MPA is now under negotiation between the UK government and government of Mauritius.

The CMPA is administered with assistance from the Chagos Trust, funded by donations and the British Government. Tourist visitors are generally not permitted, although as of 2016 private yachts sailing across the Indian Ocean may apply for mooring permits outside the strict nature reserve areas.

Description 
The Chagos marine reserve protects the world's largest coral atoll (the Great Chagos Bank) and has one of the healthiest reef systems in the cleanest waters of the world, supporting nearly half the area of good quality reefs in the Indian Ocean. No-take marine reserves are areas of the sea in which there is no fishing allowed and as little other human disturbance as can be reasonably arranged.

The Chagos Archipelago of 70 tiny islands and atolls is located in the central Indian Ocean, about 1,500 km from the southern tip of India, 3,400 km due east of Africa and 3,000 km west of Indonesia. Politically, Chagos is constituted as the British Indian Ocean Territory (BIOT).

Establishment
Previous to the establishment of the marine reserve, the Chagos Archipelago had been declared an Environmental (Preservation and Protection) Zone with legislation in place to protect much of the area's natural resources. Commercial fishing, however, was licensed for both reef fish and tuna. Though the UK government has opposed the area being proposed as a World Heritage Site, it has agreed to treat it as such in order to preserve its environmental value.

The case for a large scale marine reserve in the Chagos was first put forward by a consortium of conservation organisations led by the Chagos Environment Network, a collaboration of nine leading scientific and conservation organisations, in "The Chagos Archipelago: Its Nature and the Future"  which was launched in March 2009.  The Chagos Environment Network was the leading advocate for the reserve during the consultation period and organised two of the major petitions in favour of the reserve being set up.

From 10 November 2009 to 5 March 2010, a public consultation was carried out by the UK government to take views on whether or not a marine protected area (MPA) should be established in the archipelago. Respondents were asked not only whether they believed that the MPA should be established but also to what degree they thought it should be protected, either to establish a fully no-take marine reserve or a less protected marine protected area that would allow some fishing.

The response to this consultation was high, with over 250,000 people expressing their views on the issue either through the use of petitions or more lengthy written replies. Over 90% declared their support for greater marine protection, with the majority believing that it should be a no-take marine reserve. The loss of the approximately £800,000 a year earned from tuna licensing was frequently raised as a possible hurdle to the designation of the marine reserve. In the final months leading up to the designation, the Bertarelli Foundation offered to fill the funding gap left by the absence of fisheries income and thereby contribute to the costs of an enforcement boat for a period of five years. Following this response, the total area of the Chagos’ Exclusive Economic Zone was declared a fully no-take area, with the exception of a 3-mile zone around the island of Diego Garcia.

The British Foreign Secretary instructed the BIOT Commissioner to establish the Marine Protected Area on 1 April 2010, which was essentially the last day he could do so before the dissolution of Parliament prior to the 2010 British general election.

The Chagos MPA's establishment and first five years of protection has been supported by major funding from the Bertarelli Foundation.

Ecology and biodiversity
Ninety percent of the United Kingdom's biodiversity lies in its Overseas Territories, and the Chagos archipelago is by far the most biodiverse marine area in the United Kingdom's waters.  Its habitats include extensive shallow limestone reefs and associated environments, about 300 seamounts and a deep sea trench - an underwater canyon more than 4,900 m (16,000 ft) deep.

Coral
One of the most unusual aspects of the Chagos marine environment is its extremely healthy and diverse coral cover, which is dense even in deep water and on the steep outer slopes of reefs. The area hosts 220 species of coral including the Ctenella chagius, a variety of brain coral believed to be endemic to the atoll, and staghorn coral which is important to protecting low-lying islands from wave erosion. Chagos provides an important benchmark for coral conservation, and is a 'natural laboratory' in which we can study the functioning of these wonderfully complex ecosystems.

Fish
The fish of the region are equally diverse, with at least 784 different species having been identified including the Chagos clownfish (Amphiprion chagosensis) which is endemic to the archipelago. The strictly no-take Chagos Marine Reserve has freed Chagos' fish populations from fishing pressure within the reserve's boundaries. The marine reserve is an important refuge for overfished pelagic species such as manta rays, sharks including whale sharks, tuna and is of particular importance for globally threatened species, such as the silky shark. It is also believed, based on results of research on similar deep water and diverse underwater terrain in other parts of the world, that the deep water trench is very likely to harbour a variety of previously undiscovered species.

Turtles
The islands of the archipelago provide vital nesting sites for green and hawksbill turtles (Chelonia mydas and Eretmochelys imbricata). Since the hawksbill turtle is labelled ‘critically endangered’ and the green turtle ‘endangered’ on the IUCN Red List, the Chagos populations are considered to be of international importance.  It is estimated that 300-700 hawksbill and 400-800 green turtles nest annually across the 55 islands of the archipelago.

Mammals
Environments of Chagos Archipelago provides rich biodiversity and support varieties of cetacean species within the vicinity, such as three populations of blue whales and toothed whales (such as sperm, pilot, orca, pseudo-orca, risso's and other dolphins such as spinners). Regional extinct dugongs were historically seen in the archipelago, hence the Sea Cow Island was named due to the presences of the species.

Birds
The breeding seabirds of the Chagos are considered to be of international importance. The archipelago harbours eighteen different species of breeding birds and ten of its islands have been designated as Important Bird Areas (IBAs) by Birdlife International, making the region the most diverse breeding seabird community in this tropical region, though the presence of human-introduced rats on several of the other islands severely hinder seabird nesting on these.

Five species are considered to be breeding in internationally significant numbers: the sooty tern (Sterna fuscata); the brown and lesser noddy (Anous stolidus and Anous tenuirostris); the red-footed booby (Sula sula) and the wedge-tailed shearwater (Puffinus pacificus).

Coconut crabs
The world's largest terrestrial arthropod, the coconut crab (Birgus latro) is abundant on the islands of the Chagos archipelago, with an overall density in the conservation area on Diego Garcia of 298 crabs per hectare – the highest ever recorded. Due to the long distances which the larvae of the coconut crab can travel, the Chagos population is considered important in replenishing numbers in other areas of the Indian Ocean.

Scientific research
Scientific and conservation efforts are being undertaken to tell us more about these islands, remove invasive plant and animal species, and restore native vegetation. These initiatives are all an important contribution to the conservation of Chagos, and global biodiversity. In February and March 2013, a research expedition was undertaken in the Chagos Marine Protected Area (MPA). The expedition, which was sponsored by the Bertarelli Foundation, in partnership with Stanford University and the University of Western Australia, piloted an electronic tagging project to examine the feasibility of using remote technologies to monitor the movement of important pelagic species in the region. Five different types of electronic tags were deployed in this study, with a total of 99 electronic tags placed on 95 animals, along with the installation of an acoustic receiver array around two northern atolls to detect animal movements.

Pollution
According to a report by a scientific adviser to the Foreign and Commonwealth Office, which the British Government refused to disclose, suggests that the Pacific Marlin, an ageing tug hired by London used to patrol the British Indian Ocean Territories, had been discharging waste while docked in waters shared with US Navy vessels. The Independent also revealed that American ships have been pouring waste including treated human sewage for three decades into the lagoon on Diego Garcia, which has served as a key strategic base for the US since the 1970s.

Mauritian opposition to Marine Protected Area
The MPA has been condemned by Mauritius, who administered the Chagos Islands before they were detached by the UK before the colony was granted independence. Previously, both Mauritius and the Chagos Islands were British territory, although there was no joint nationality between the two areas. The Government of Mauritius initiated proceedings on 20 December 2010 against the UK Government under the United Nations Convention on the Law of the Sea (UNCLOS) to challenge the legality of the marine protected area. Mauritius considers that the UK, not being a "coastal State" under UNCLOS and international law, had no authority to purport to establish a marine protected area around the Chagos Archipelago and that the MPA was not compatible with the rights of the Chagossians.

The original Chagossians were deported from the largest island, Diego Garcia, 40 years earlier to make way for Naval Support Facility Diego Garcia, with port facilities and an airstrip capable of handling the largest aircraft in the US Air Force. The Chagossians say they would in effect be barred from ever returning because the marine protection zone would stop them fishing, their main livelihood. "There would be a natural injustice. The fish would have more rights than us, the conservation groups have fallen into a trap. They are being used by the government to prevent us returning," said Roch Evenor, secretary of the UK Chagos Support Association.

Greenpeace
In a letter to Greenpeace, the Mauritian Lalit de Klas political party said "The British government's plan for a marine protected area is a grotesquely transparent ruse designed to perpetuate the banning of the people of Mauritius and Chagos from part of their own country,"

In 2012, Greenpeace ship SY Rainbow Warrior was in the Indian Ocean region and the government of Mauritius initially blocked it from making a scheduled stopover at  Port-Louis harbour. The reason for the refusal was the unconditional support that Greenpeace has given the British authorities in the controversial project of a protected marine park in the Chagos archipelago. Mauritius has officially denounced the "hypocritical" position of Greenpeace on this matter and deeply regrets that Greenpeace International chose to close its eyes on the illegal excision of the Chagos archipelago by the UK, despite its being recognised as part of Mauritius by various international groups. Mauritius insisted that Greenpeace, which claims to be fighting for environmental protection, showed a hypocritical attitude by remaining silent over the proposed construction of a marine park.

Thus, in official correspondence, Greenpeace International said at the outset that:

WikiLeaks
On 1 December 2010, WikiLeaks released a leaked US Embassy London diplomatic cable dating back to 2009 exposing British and US calculations in creating the marine nature reserve. The cable relays exchanges between US Political Counselor Richard Mills and British Director of the Foreign and Commonwealth Office Colin Roberts, in which Roberts "asserted that establishing a marine park would, in effect, put paid to resettlement claims of the archipelago’s former residents." Richard Mills concludes:

The cable which records Roberts' assertion that the marine reserve was proposed by the Pew Charitable Trust, was classified as confidential and "no foreigners", and leaked as part of the Cablegate cache.

The same cable explained that the protection would permit environmental damage if caused by military use: "the terms of reference for the establishment of a marine park would clearly state that the BIOT, including Diego Garcia, was reserved for military uses. ... the establishment of a marine reserve had the potential to be a 'win-win situation in terms of establishing situational awareness' of the BIOT. ... [the government] sought 'no constraints on military operations' as a result of the establishment of a marine park."

Chagos Marine Protected Area declared illegal
After the Permanent Court of Arbitration decision, the Prime Minister of Mauritius pointed out that it is the first time that the UK's conduct with regard to the Chagos Archipelago has been considered and condemned by any international court or tribunal. He qualified the ruling as an important milestone in the relentless struggle, at the political, diplomatic and other levels, of successive Governments over the years for the effective exercise by Mauritius of its sovereignty over the Chagos Archipelago. The tribunal considered in detail the undertakings given by the United Kingdom to the Mauritian Ministers at the Lancaster House talks in September 1965. The UK had argued that those undertakings were not binding and had no status in international law. The Tribunal firmly rejected that argument, holding that those undertakings became a binding international agreement upon the independence of Mauritius, and have bound the UK ever since. It found that the UK's commitments towards Mauritius in relation to fishing rights and oil and mineral rights in the Chagos Archipelago are legally binding.

Exclusion of Chagossian peoples 
The Chagos MPA was designated in 2010, during a legal deliberation about whether natives of Chagos would be able to return to the island after forty years of exile. If they return, they will not be able to fish for subsistence because of the MPA's status as a strict no-take reserve. Despite this, fishing is allowed around the atoll of Diego Garcia, the island where the joint UK-US military base is located. Diego Garcia, the only current pollution source in the archipelago, is exempt with the purpose of maintaining military operations. The establishment of the Chagos MPA sustains the injustice that the prior removal of the indigenous Chagossians represents by ignoring their pursuits to return to their home. Even though the rights to the archipelago are disputed, the sovereignty of Chagos clearly rests with the UK, who have complete control of access to and withdrawal of resources from the islands.

See also 
Mauritius v. United Kingdom

References

External links
 Chagos Conservation Trust
 Chagos country profile on the UK Foreign and Commonwealth Office website
 Bertarelli Foundation Chagos page
 Zoological Society of London's Chagos pages

Chagos Archipelago
Nature reserves
Undersea banks of the Indian Ocean
Reefs of the Indian Ocean
Lists of coordinates
Environmental controversies
Marine protected areas
Mauritius–United Kingdom relations
United Kingdom–United States relations
WikiLeaks